Barry Phillips-Moore  (born 9 June 1938) is an Australian former tennis player of the 1950s, 1960s, and 1970s.

In singles, Phillips-Moore twice reached the semifinals of the Australian Championships, in 1961 and 1968.  In doubles, he was a quarterfinalist at Australian Championships / Australian Open eight times and the French Open once, in 1972.

Career singles titles

Open era finals (2)

Doubles champion (1)

Singles finalist (1)

External links
 
 

1938 births
Australian male tennis players
Living people
Tennis players from Adelaide